Leo Chiangrai Stadium is a stadium in Ban Du, Mueang Chiang Rai, Chiang Rai Province, Thailand. It is currently used mostly for football matches and is the home stadium of Chiangrai United. The stadium has a capacity of 11,354 people and is located near Mae Fah Luang International Airport.

Name
The name of the ground changed due to sponsorship agreements, the first time it was changed from the original name, United Stadium of Chiangrai, to Singha Stadium following the sponsorship in 2017. However, the stadium is still referred as its original name of the United Stadium of Chiang Rai in AFC competitions. On 15 October 2021, Thai League Co., Ltd approves the request made by Chiangrai United F.C. to change their club name from Singha Chiangrai United to Leo Chiangrai United and their stadium's name from Singha Stadium, to Leo Chiangrai Stadium, which the changes will be applied from 17 October 2021 onwards.

References

External links
http://www.smmsport.com/reader.php?news=187703
http://sport.sanook.com/412261/

Football venues in Thailand
Buildings and structures in Chiang Rai province
Sports venues completed in 2012
2012 establishments in Thailand